Thomas P. Koch (born January 22, 1963) is the thirty-third and current mayor of Quincy, Massachusetts.

Biography
Mayor Koch was born and raised in Quincy the sixth of seven children to Simone and Richard J. Koch. He is 1981 a graduate of North Quincy High School and was the class president. He took classes at the University of Massachusetts Boston, however does not have a college degree. Quincy Mayor James Sheets appointed him his top aide in 1990. In 1995, he was appointed commissioner of the city's Park Department.

Political career
In February 2007, he resigned and challenged Sheets' successor, William J. Phelan. Koch defeated Phelan 54% to 46%.

Mr. Koch has served as chairman of the MBTA Advisory Board since 2011.

Koch was formerly a Democrat but left the party in 2018 because of his pro-life views. Later that year, he endorsed Republican Governor Charlie Baker's bid for re-election in the 2018 Massachusetts Gubernatorial Election.

In August 2021, the MBTA Advisory Board selected Koch to serve as its representative on the MBTA Board of Directors.

During 2018, Koch was interim president of the municipally-affiliated Quincy College.

Personal life
Koch is Roman Catholic. Koch is the brother-in-law of Massachusetts State Senator John F. Keenan.

References

External links
 Official page of Mayor Koch
 City's web site

1963 births
Living people
Massachusetts Democrats
Mayors of Quincy, Massachusetts
North Quincy High School alumni